is a former Japanese football player.

Club statistics

References

External links

1984 births
Living people
Kindai University alumni
Association football people from Osaka Prefecture
Japanese footballers
J2 League players
Japan Football League players
Matsumoto Yamaga FC players
FC Gifu players
Mito HollyHock players
Association football forwards